A bulla, an amulet worn like a locket, was given to male children in Ancient Rome nine days after birth. Rather similar objects are rare finds from Late Bronze Age Ireland.

Roman bullae

Roman bullae were enigmatic objects of lead, sometimes covered in gold foil, if the family could afford it. A bulla was worn around the neck as a locket to protect against evil spirits and forces. Bullae were made of differing substances depending upon the wealth of the family.

Roman boys
Before the age of manhood, Roman boys wore a bulla, a neckchain and round pouch containing protective amulets (usually phallic symbols), and the bulla of an upper-class boy would be made of gold. Other materials included leather and cloth.

A freeborn Roman boy wore a bulla until he came of age as a Roman citizen. Before he put on his toga virilis ("toga of manhood") he placed his boyhood bulla in the care of his parental household deities (Lares). Some modern sources interpret Macrobius's single reference to an amulet worn by a triumphal general during his procession as evidence that the childhood bulla was also a standard item of triumphal regalia.

Roman girls

A Roman girl did not wear a bulla per se, but another kind of amulet called a lunula, until the eve of her marriage, when it was removed along with her childhood toys and other things. She would then stop wearing child's clothes and start wearing women's Roman dress.

Bronze Age Ireland
A small number of bullae have been found in Ireland; they are called "bullae" based on their resemblance to the Roman form. The Irish bullae so far found were made of base metal – sometimes clay – covered with a folded over piece of gold foil. The Irish bullae date to the Late Bronze Age, about 1150–750 BCE.

They were presumably worn suspended round the neck with a cord running through the hole below the flat top. The body of the bulla has roughly vertical sides before making a semi-circle or inverted pointed arch at the bottom. The gold is incised with geometrical decoration.

Whether they were purely for adornment or had an amuletic or other function is unclear.  Despite the small weight of gold used they would have been available only for elite groups.

See also
Shropshire bulla
Bulla (seal)

Notes

References

External links 
 https://www.britishmuseum.org/collection/object/G_1872-0604-838-a
 https://www.britishmuseum.org/collection/search?keyword=roman&keyword=bulla
 https://www.britishmuseum.org/collection/object/G_1872-0604-838-a
 https://www.britishmuseum.org/collection/object/G_1814-0704-1174
 https://www.britishmuseum.org/collection/object/G_1872-0604-672
 https://www.britishmuseum.org/collection/object/G_1846-0629-13

Amulets
Prehistoric Ireland
Childhood in ancient Rome
Archaeological artefact types
Bronze Age art
Necklaces
Ancient Roman metalwork